The Classic Learning Test (or CLT) is a standardized test developed by Classic Learning Initiatives, which was founded in 2015 by Jeremy Tate and is based in Annapolis, Maryland. The test was designed as an alternative to other standardized tests such as the SAT and ACT. CLT board member, Chad Pecknold says the CLT exam is devised to follow the “great classical and Christian tradition.” 

The exam is conducted online, taking approximately two hours to complete, and normally issues same-day test scores; scores are calculated out of 120. Two preparatory exams are also offered: the CLT10, designed for high school freshmen and sophomores, and the CLT8, for seventh and eighth grade students. CLT10 scores have been indexed to PSAT scores, though the highest range of CLT10 scores exceeds the equivalent of a 1600 on the PSAT.

Schools that accept CLT 
The CLT is accepted by 200 predominately religious-based colleges and universities across the United States and Canada, many of which are evangelical and Catholic schools.    
 Baylor University
 Biola University
 Bob Jones University
Cedarville University
 Clemson University - Lyceum Scholars Program	
 Liberty University
 Mount St. Mary's University
 Palm Beach Atlantic University
 Saint Vincent College
 St. Olaf College
 Wheaton College (in Illinois)
Zaytuna College

References

Standardized tests in the United States